The Avenue railway station served the village of Seaton Sluice, England from 1861 to 1864 on the Blyth and Tyne Railway.

History 
The station opened on 1 April 1861 by the Blyth and Tyne Railway. The station was situated at the former level crossing close to the junction with St Michael's Avenue. The original name was apparently Dairy House in the timetable but it was renamed The Avenue some months later. The station was very short lived and the exact closure date is unknown. It closed to passengers on 27 June 1864 but there was still evidence of use on summer Sundays in 1872 and 1874.

References

External links 

Disused railway stations in Northumberland
Former North Eastern Railway (UK) stations
Railway stations in Great Britain opened in 1861
Railway stations in Great Britain closed in 1864
1861 establishments in England
1864 disestablishments in England